Jean-Pierre Timbaud (Payzac, Dordogne, September 20, 1904 - Chateaubriant, October 22, 1941) was the secretary of the steelworkers’ trade union section of the Confédération Générale du Travail (CGT). He took part in the strikes which preceded the Popular Front. During the Second World War, he joined the Resistance and organized clandestine trade union committees.

Jean-Pierre Timbaud was executed by the Germans on October 22, 1941, along with 26 other Communist hostages detained in Châteaubriant, in punishment of the October 20 execution of Feldkommandant Karl Hotz, commander of the German troops in the Loire-Inférieure region, who was assassinated in Nantes by Resistants. Guy Môquet, 17 years old, was also part of the executed communist hostages, as well as Charles Michels, a Communist deputy of the 15th arrondissement of Paris. Jacques Duclos, Secretary General of the French Communist Party, said in an interview in the film The Sorrow and the Pity (1969), that Jean-Pierre Timbaud died crying out "Long live the German Communist Party!", while Léon Blum declared during the Riom Trial that he had sung the "Marseillaise" before the firing squad. Louis Aragon also stated: “The name of Timbaud among the Châteaubriant hostages was to be my direct reason, my individual reason to accept the clandestine duty which fell on me.”

Several cities in France, such as Paris and Limoges, have streets named after him. Previously, a street in East Berlin was named Timbaudstraße after him as well, but after German reunification, the street was renamed Fredersdorfer Straße.

Timbaud is the first name on the memorial to Heroes of the French Resistance in Pere Lachaise Cemetery in Paris.

Bibliography 
Lucien Monjauvis, Jean-Pierre Timbaud (Editions Sociales, 1971)
Fernand Grenier, Ceux de Châteaubriand (Editions Sociales, 1971)
Louis Aragon, Le Témoin des Martyrs (1942)
Lettres de fusillés 1941-1944

See also 
Henri Rol-Tanguy

External links 
Le Procès de Riom: Eloge de Jean-Pierre Timbaud et des combattants de Stalingrad, Léon Blum’s statement in favor of Timbaud during the Riom Trial  
Biography on Timbaud 
"Berlin: Jean-Pierre Timbaud indésirable", in L'Humanité, September 22, 1990  (search for "Jean-Pierre Timbaud" on L’Humanité’s English website for translations).
On 1936 strike organized by Timbaud, in L’Humanité, July 25, 2006 
"Châteaubriant, assassinat politique de 27 otages", in L’Humanité, October 20, 2001  (with the list here of the 27 executed hostages)

1904 births
1941 deaths
People from Dordogne
French Communist Party politicians
Members of the General Confederation of Labour (France)
Communist members of the French Resistance
Resistance members killed by Nazi Germany
French people executed by Nazi Germany
Executed people from Aquitaine
Burials at Père Lachaise Cemetery